The Denny Party is a group of American pioneers credited with founding Seattle, Washington. They settled at Alki Point on November 13, 1851.

History
A wagon party headed by Arthur A. Denny left Cherry Grove, Illinois on April 10, 1851. The party included his father John Denny, stepmother, two older brothers who settled in the Willamette Valley of Oregon, his younger brother David Denny, his wife, Mary Ann Boren, Mary's younger sister Louisa, and their brother Carson Boren. Mary Ann was Arthur Denny's wife and his stepsister, and was pregnant throughout the journey. Mary's sister Louisa Boren married David Denny in 1861. Arthur Denny was also ill throughout the journey, but remained the group's leader.

On July 6, 1851, the party battled Native Americans at American Falls on the Snake River, but escaped unharmed. The following day they met John Low, and he joined the party. Late in July they reached the Burnt River in eastern Oregon where they encountered a man named Brock. He suggested to Denny that Puget Sound would be a good place to create a town.

The Denny Party arrived in Portland, Oregon on August 22, 1851. Arthur Denny was ill and Mary Ann was about to give birth so the party convalesced in Portland. On September 2, Mary gave birth to a son, Rolland H. Denny.

John Low and David Denny headed north to scout the possibilities. Along the way they were joined by Leander "Lee" Terry. In newly founded Olympia, Washington, they met Michael Simmons, the wealthy founder of Tumwater. He guided them to Alki as a possible site for a settlement. On September 28, 1851, Terry and Low began building a cabin with help from the local Native Americans, and then staked claims to the land. Low returned to Portland to alert the others, Terry looked for a froe to make redcedar shake shingles, and David Denny stayed on in the unfinished cabin. Like his brother, he was not in good health, and his situation was not improved by staying in an unroofed cabin. He injured his foot with an axe.

In Portland, Arthur Denny recruited Illinois farmer William Nathaniel Bell and his wife, and, by coincidence, Charlie Terry, Leander's younger brother. The Terry brothers, from Waterville, New York, had come west as part of the California Gold Rush, but had not liked the rough and tumble of San Francisco.

On November 5, 1851, the Denny Party left Portland on the schooner Exact, bound for Puget Sound and Haida Gwaii. The Exact carried a number of settlers bound for Puget Sound in addition to the Denny Party, including Daniel Bigelow who settled in Olympia.  After a difficult passage, particularly hard on the still-ill Denny, they arrived at Alki on November 13, where David greeted them with the words, "I wish you hadn't come."

Denny was bitterly disappointed that Low and Lee Terry had already staked the relevant claims for Alki. However, he had no choice but to pitch in, finish the cabin and settle in for the winter. Denny convinced Bell and Boren that they needed to scout a different location. Once the worst of winter cleared, Denny and other party members explored as far as Commencement Bay (now the site of Tacoma), Port Orchard, Smith Cove, and up the Duwamish River to the present site of Puyallup, before settling on an island in the mudflats near the east shore of Elliott Bay, now the site of Pioneer Square.

For the next three years Alki Point and Elliott Bay sites competed as rival townsites. Charlie Terry bought out his brother's and Low's Alki holdings, and led this community. Arthur Denny settled at Elliott Bay and, along with his rival "Doc" Maynard, led the development of Seattle. The tides at Alki were so strong that piers could not be built. Terry moved to the community on the east shore of Elliott Bay, which became the nucleus of the city of Seattle.

Monument

The Birthplace of Seattle Monument at Alki Beach is inscribed with the names of all members of the Denny Party.

References

 William C. ("Bill") Speidel, Sons of the Profits, Nettle Creek Publishing Company, Seattle, 1967. 

History of Seattle
American city founders
Washington (state) pioneers
1851 in the United States